Alexei Maximov (born 1952) is a Soviet-born enamellist, portrait painter of European royals, and oil painter who currently resides in Saint Petersburg, Russia. He is known for using traditional methods of enamel art production, without the aid of contemporary digital set ovens, and is considered a modern master of the artform.

Career
In his work Maximov has used traditional methods of enamel art production, without contemporary digital set ovens. During the late 20th-century, Maximov led a resurgence of enamel-based art in Russia. The first exhibition of Maximov’s work occurred at the Podolsk Town Museum in 1979, and the second was held in 1979 at the State Literature Museum in Moscow. Another exhibition Maximov’s work took place at the Kremlin Armoury. In 2012 an exhibition of his work was held in the William Kent House in London, showing his enamel miniature portraits of members of the royal families of the UK, the Netherlands, and Norway. This included the twentieth anniversary of his portrait of Queen Elizabeth II as well as her Diamond Jubilee.

Following the exhibition of the works, which can only be seen by appointment, they were put up for auction. Queen Elizabeth II recommended that Princess Anne sit for Maximov the following week, and Queen Elizabeth, The Queen Mother later that month. His work has been a part of around one hundred art exhibitions.

Gallery

Museums 

The artist's works are presented in the collections of museums:

 Moscow Kremlin Museums. Moscow
The State Hermitage Museum, St Petersburg   
 State Historical Museum. Moscow
State Museum of the History of St. Petersburg. St. Petersburg
 State Literary Museum. Moscow
Literature Museum of Dostoyevsky, St Petersburg
 The Museum & Nature Reserve «Tsaritsyno». Moscow
All-Russian Museum of Decorative and Applied Arts. Moscow
 Enamel Museum Limoges. France
 Collection of Queen Elizabeth II, London

Personal life
Alexei Maximov is from St. Petersburg, Russia.

Awards 
In 1982 the artist was awarded the International Award for Remarkable Artistic Achievement on the III Quadriennale of Applied Arts in Erfurt, Germany.

In 1988 he was awarded the Grand Prix of the Leningrad Committee of The Union of Russian Artists.

In the same year, the miniature "Vernissage", after receiving the purchase prize, was placed in the exposition of the Enamel Museum in Limoges (France).

References

20th-century Russian artists
21st-century Russian artists
Living people
1952 births